Slovenian commercial TV channel POP TV had begun the new format of reality shows in Slovenia. After two successful seasons of Slovenija ima talent (Slovenian version of the Talent show Got Talent), and due to huge viewership, POP TV aired a new version of singing competition reality show - called X Faktor (Slovenian version of reality show X Factor). Anyone who was at least 14 years old could join alone, or in a group.

Judges' categories and their contestants

In each season, each judge is allocated a category to mentor and chooses three acts to progress to the live shows. This table shows, for each season, which category each judge was allocated and which acts he or she put through to the live shows.

Key:
 – Winning judge/category. Winners are in bold, eliminated contestants in small font.

1st. season

Judges

Damjan Damjanovič - Slovenian Philharmony principal

Jadranka Juras - Slovenian singer

Aleš Uranjek - member of the former Šank Rock music group

Producer's auditions (Avdicija)

Auditions for the first season of X Factor had taken place from 14 to 29 January 2012 in the biggest Slovenian cities across the country. There, the producers of the show chose the candidates which were good enough to take part in the next step of the competition - Judges' auditions (Avdicija pred žirijo).

Dates of Producer's auditions

Judges's auditions (Avdicija pred žirijo)

The judges auditions of the candidates who had convinced the producers that they could sing were held in the Kino Šiška complex in Ljubljana, in front of an audience. After the singing, each judge commented on their singing and give him/her/them a "YES" if they wanted that the candidate to continue in the competition, or a "NO", if she/he/they were not good enough to take part in the further competition - Bootcamp (X-Kamp).

The judges auditions were shown on POP TV for 4 Sundays.

Bootcamp (X-Kamp)

The Bootcamp lasted for four days.

In the first day, the 87 candidates sang to the judges in groups. Each group had to choose one song from the list which has been given to them. They had to talk-over which part of the song will sing which candidate. After the candidates sang in front of two judges, they eliminated some of the candidates which did not convinced them that they have "The X-Factor". Only half of the candidates survived the first day of Bootcamp.

In the second day of the Bootcamp, the candidates were taught some dance moves. No candidate was eliminated, because they all danced as they had been taught. After this task, the judges threw a big party for all the candidates in the Austria Trend Hotel, Ljubljana (the same place, as the Bootcamp shows were made). The candidates could join the party, or go to sleep to one of the rooms in Hotel. The candidates knew that the next day could be the most important day of all, because they had to sing in front of the judges for the last time and then the judges would choose 6 of them from each group (Teens, Adults and groups) to continue in the competition. But most of them chose to join the party.

The third day was the most important day of all in Bootcamp days. The candidates may sing in front of the judges for the very last time. After that, the judges just had to decide which 6 candidates from each category (Teens, Adults and groups) are the best and may to enter the Judge`s houses (Finalna eliminacija).

In the fourth day the candidates found out is they are chosen for TOP 6 in they`re group. After this only six Teens, six Adults and six groups could enter Judge's House (Finalna eliminacija) for the final elimination before the Live shows (Oddaje v živo).

Candidates which were chosen by the judges to continue the competition:

Category: Adults

Category: Groups

Category: Teens

After the candidates for Judge's House or final elimination were chosen, each judge got his own category from which he would have to choose 3 out of 6 candidates, and be the mentor for them in the Live shows. But no judge did know which category would he get before choosing the TOP 6 candidates in each category.

Categories and their judges:

The Bootcamp was shown on POP TV for 2 Sundays.

Judge's House (Finalna eliminacija)

In Judge's House all three judges take their chosen candidates to a special place, where the candidates would sing in front of the judges and the special guest chosen by the judge, for the very last time. After that, each judge will choose which 3 candidates, from each group out of six, can enter the Live shows.

Jandranka Juras took the category Over 21 to Hotel Palace, Portorož in city of Portorož, Slovenia. Jadranka's special guest was a former singer in the popular Slovenian band called Tabu, Nina Vodopivec.

Aleš Urenjak took the category Groups to Mokrice Castle near to the city of Jesenice, in Slovenia. Aleš`s special guest was Nina Pušlar, one of the most popular pop singers in Slovenia.

Damjan Damjanovič took the category 14-20s to city of La Subide, in Italy. Damjan`s special guest was his wife, a world-known opera singer Sabina Cvilak Damjanovič from Slovenia.

Candidates which were chosen by the judges (now also mentors), to enter the Live Shows in the each group

The Judge's House was shown on POP TV for two Sundays.

Contestants

Key:
 – Winner
 – Runner up
 – Third Place

Live shows

Results summary

Colour key

References

Slovenia
Television series by Fremantle (company)
2012 Slovenian television series debuts
2012 Slovenian television series endings
2010s Slovenian television series
Non-British television series based on British television series
Pop (Slovenian TV channel) original programming